Berwyn Rangers Football Club were a Welsh football team from Llangollen, Denbighshire.

History
Berwyn Rangers were formed on 22 October 1880 when Llangollen FC changed their name.

Cup History

Notable players
  Harry Adams - Wales Football International
  John Jones - Wales Football International
  John Roberts - Wales Football International
  William Roberts - Wales Football International

Other Info
Also see Llangollen F.C and Llangollen Town F.C.

References

Defunct football clubs in Wales
Sport in Wrexham
Sport in Wrexham County Borough